That Mitchell and Webb Look is a British sketch comedy television show starring David Mitchell and Robert Webb that ran from 2006 to 2010. Many of its characters and sketches were first featured in the duo's radio show That Mitchell and Webb Sound. 

As well as Mitchell and Webb themselves, the writers include Jesse Armstrong, James Bachman, Sam Bain, Mark Evans, Olivia Colman, Joel Morris, John Finnemore, Simon Kane. It was produced by Gareth Edwards. Colman, Bachman, and Evans were also members of the cast, alongside Gus Brown, Sarah Hadland, Daniel Kaluuya and Paterson Joseph. The first two series were directed by David Kerr, and the third and fourth series were directed by Ben Gosling Fuller.

First aired on 14 September 2006, a second series was commissioned later that same year and was broadcast between 21 February and 27 March 2008. The third series began on 11 June 2009. Since the second series, the production has also been broadcast on BBC HD. The first series won a BAFTA award in 2007. The third series began airing on BBC America on 14 April 2010. The fourth series premiered on BBC Two and BBC HD on 13 July 2010 with a total of six episodes commissioned by the BBC. In a November 2011 interview, Webb stated that there were no plans for another series and added that "you'd have to ask the BBC" about further series.

Recurring sketches
That Mitchell and Webb Look includes many recurring sketches, or sketches with recurring themes. Those that feature in multiple episodes include:
Numberwang: A "maths quiz" game show in which two contestants, Simon and Julie (Paterson Joseph and Olivia Colman), call out numbers until the host (Webb) declares "That's Numberwang." The rules of the game are left completely unexplained to the viewer, and appear to follow no logic whatsoever, to the point that sometimes the gameplay contradicts itself (for instance, a character giving an answer which is deemed wrong, immediately followed by another character giving the exact same answer which is deemed correct). Despite this, all characters onscreen act as though the rules are clear and obvious. The game goes through several rounds with varying formats (all of which incorporate 'number' or 'wang' into their titles), until the final round, titled "Wangernumb". Before the round, the host declares that it is time to "rotate the board"—resulting in an interlude where the contestant area, which is on one side of a turntable, is spun in a full revolution to briefly reveal a non-sequitur scene on the other side of the wall, such as a Nativity scene, a game of Russian roulette or a confused newsreader, before it returns to the first two. The game is almost consistently won by Simon with the prizes including an oversized cheque originally intended for Children in Need or a knighthood, while the losing contestant suffers varying indignities such as being stuffed into a cardboard box or arrested by the police. One sketch features a variation known as Wordwang ("the spin-off series with a difference, and that difference is words"), and another features a German-language adaptation, Nümberwang (which is hosted by Mitchell). One sketch features a sudden death tie-break round after neither contestant correctly calls "Numberwang"; the round was won by the first contestant (Julie) to die after inhaling toxic Nitrogen dioxide, described by the host as being made from the number two (NO2). The Numberwang episodes were only featured during series 1; series 2 featured other sketches themed around the show, such as a trailer for The Numberwang Code (a parody of The Da Vinci Code), as well as an advert for the show's home game (which includes a board, numbers, two 400-sided dice and a 37-volume rulebook), and a mockumentary on the show's history which reveals that the show was based on a series of treatises written by Bertrand Russell and had aired since the 1930s, and that determining a Numberwang was an extremely complex process that was later simplified via the use of a robot known as Colosson, a play on the name of the early computer, which had a habit of trying to take over the world and could only be shut down when shown a picture of a chicken. What Numberwang actually means is never revealed.
Ted and Peter: a pair of alcoholic, chain-smoking snooker commentators and retired players. Ted Wilkes is played by David Mitchell and Peter DeCoursey by Robert Webb. They tell insensitive stories about the (generally fictional) players, bringing up things such as one player's attempts at suicide and another's sexuality, rather than focusing on the game (other than Ted's occasional comment of "Oh and that's a bad miss!"). They also drink heavily throughout the sketch. One sketch, purportedly a short documentary during an actual snooker broadcast introduced by Hazel Irvine, features them reminiscing over a championship final they played which lasted several days since neither were sober enough to take a shot. By Series 4, the commentating careers of Ted and Peter have taken a downward turn, being forced to commentate on Late Night Dog Poker on Dave.
Behind The Scenes: a supposedly "behind-the-scenes" look at how the show is produced, starring Mitchell and Webb as reconstructed versions of themselves. Although ostensibly involved in the production of the programme, the pair are frequently drawn into furious arguments with one another, often playing on the perceived public personas of the pair; Mitchell being highly intelligent but socially inexperienced and Webb being confident and socially popular but lacking intelligence. 
The Surprising Adventures of Sir Digby Chicken Caesar: a drunken, drug-addled homeless man (Webb), who is under the delusion that he is a brilliant and intrepid detective or adventurer, dressed in a manner reminiscent of Sherlock Holmes. He and his companion Ginger (Mitchell) commit various crimes whilst supposedly engaging in battle against the henchmen of their so-called "nemesis". SnorriCam is used in parts of the sketches. The sketches usually include Sir Digby Chicken Caesar singing along, off-key and off-rhythm, to the tune of "Devil's Galop" from the BBC radio series Dick Barton, often mid-escape from a potentially contentious situation. In Series 3, there was an additional sketch where Ginger is run over by a car after being shoved onto the road by Sir Digby, which ended up with him being hospitalised, becoming sober and gaining a job working at a DIY shop, before Digby tricks him into redescending into alcoholism.
Big Talk: a debate show hosted by the confrontational Raymond Terrific (Webb), who loudly bullies his panel of so-called "boffins" into giving yes or no answers to huge social and philosophical questions (e.g., "is there a god?"). A charity special, Small Talk, involved Terrific asking reality stars minor questions such as "what's your favourite crisp flavour?" or "what do you do to relax?", much to his irritation. In a special scene, Terrific hosts a Big Talk: Credit Crunch Special, bringing the programme back two years after airing to remedy his own property problems.
The Quiz Broadcast: a post-apocalyptic television quiz show hosted by Mitchell (who repeatedly reminds viewers to "remain indoors") and transmitted by the British Emergency Broadcasting System in an underground bunker. The show is being aired in the immediate years after "The Event", an unexplained disaster that left most of the human race dead, including all of the children. The sickly contestants on the show are survivors "trying to enjoy themselves" whilst avoiding any traumatic memories of "the Event"—Peter (a blind man played by Webb), Sheila, and Unknown Male 282. Prizes in the game consist of the sparse food and fuel supplies they have in their bunker, with the programme often parodying the formats of other quiz and panel shows such as Who Wants To Be A Millionaire and Have I Got News For You. The questions asked often revolve around "pre-Event" subject matter, of which the contestants (or the host) have little to no knowledge (for instance; identifying Eric Morecambe as a 'pre-event' world leader), while later sketches demonstrate the increasing deterioration of society, morale and health, and suggest that a cannibalistic race referred to as "Them" had overrun the area. The sketch ends on a sombre note with Peter and the host being the last survivors of the bunker and possibly even the human race; Peter remains hopeful that help will come, but the host knows that it will not. In March 2020, 13 years after the original broadcast, these sketches and the 'Remain Indoors' banner in particular, began trending heavily on social media due to the COVID-19 pandemic and the associated national lockdowns.
Friends Of...: two housemates, played by Mitchell and Webb, discussing whom to invite to their next party—usually fictional characters or historical figures, whilst making snide remarks about said character's personality traits.
The British Broadcasting Corporation: an old-fashioned black-and-white broadcast, set at a time when television is a very recent invention.
Barry Crisp (Mitchell) runs a range of unsafe attractions, such as charging £2 to jump off a cliff. His customer (Webb) is oblivious to the obvious danger of these stunts and agrees to pay to take part in them, to Crisp's surprise.
The Honeymoon's Over: Mitchell plays a rude, condescending, posh man who has replaced a staff member in various jobs (such as waiter or vicar). He angrily demeans his customers (Webb and Colman), trying to make them feel uncomfortable. Mitchell's characters personify less modern worldviews based on ideas of stricter social orders and less allowance for individuality, while those of Colman and Webb represent contemporary caricatures of casually interested neophytes.
Get Me Hennimore!: a parody of 1970s sitcoms, each episode featuring the nervous Hennimore (Webb) being given two important tasks by his boss (Mitchell), which are easy to confuse: for instance, they may be based on two organisations with identical initials. The sketches always end with Hennimore mixing the tasks up and the boss shouting "Hennimore!" angrily and his glasses gratuitously breaking. During Series 4, the sketches were invariably Christmas-themed.
The Helivets: a sketch parodying TV shows that follow emergency services. The Helivets claim they can rescue any pet in peril; however, the pets are all dead by the time they arrive. Webb's character remains optimistic, ignoring Mitchell's simple statements of fact that the pet cannot be saved.
Lazy Writers: two script writers, John Gibson (Webb) and Andrew Turner (Mitchell) give an interview for their latest programme, which they did not bother to research. Short clips from their work, including a medical drama, a legal drama, and a sports film, are shown after the interview, featuring very simplistic dialogue and obvious caricatures, one programme being an unsubtle parody of Secret Diary of a Call Girl. In one episode, they did not bother to edit their scripts for their legal drama series Speedo to reflect the recasting of the titular character following the sudden death of his portraying actor, resulting in said character being explicitly characterised as white despite now being played by a black actor.
Arguing Couple: a couple who talk to their baby daughter in cutesy voices about the problems in their relationship, breaking off to snarl "Up yours!" at each other and make violent hand gestures. The couple and their daughter are played by Robert Webb and Abigail Burdess, his off-screen wife, and their baby daughter.
Small Office: Mitchell plays a boss who has conversations with his employees in his tiny office, which makes it difficult to discuss the matter in hand.
Didldidi: a series of adverts promoting discounted but obviously disgusting or low-quality products being sold at the supermarket chain Didldidi, a parody of the German discount chains Lidl and Aldi, which were becoming increasingly popular amongst UK shoppers at the time.
A Prayer and a Pint: a light religious show (a parody of Highway) hosted by Donny Cosy (Mitchell), set in various, often exotic, locations including CERN, Japan or Iran. Cosy gives a short description of the place he is in despite being clearly out of his depth (for example, suggesting CERN are planning to blow up the universe and confusing Iran for Iraq) followed by him drinking a pint and singing a hymn requested by a viewer that is always the same; Phil and Meg McQueen from Sulky Abbott in Sussex, which Donny frequently humorously misreads as 'bumsex'.
Wacky History: a wacky historian, an unsubtle parody of Adam Hart-Davis (Webb), tries to make history exciting through absurd, often unrelated props.
Sensitive Freak-shows: fake adverts for various documentaries for Channel 5, which show people with ridiculous deformities including a boy with a posterior for a face, a woman with a second head who hates her and a man with nineteen penises. The narrator repeatedly comments that the documentary seems sad, but viewers only watch to laugh at the people with the absurd problems.
Car Boot Sale: the buyers (Mitchell and/or Colman) attempt to purchase various items at a car boot sale, such as the Holy Grail or the wardrobe leading to Narnia. The seller (Webb) quotes low prices for these items, and does not appear interested in their magical properties.
Policeman and Community Support Officer: a policeman (Mitchell) is on the beat with a police community support officer (Webb). The policeman openly and repeatedly berates his partner for "pretending to be a policeman".
Captain Todger: a politically incorrect superhero (Webb) is seen at a press conference after he has saved the day in some way, where he expresses views and feelings that make the assembled journalists uncomfortable. His arch-nemesis, General Drayfox (Mitchell), is a politically correct conqueror. 
Unexplained Gestures: a director struggles to film an actor who repeats odd gestures or out-of-context phrases without being aware of it.
Top Secret Government Conspiracies: a series of sketches where three government agents discuss plans to carry out popular conspiracy theories—the death of Princess Diana, the fake moon landings and the suppression of alien contact—while inadvertently pointing out the flaws in such plans.
Colin and Ray: Two men who work in a shared office space. Colin (Webb) is a hostage negotiator, while Ray (Mitchell) writes the scripts for pornographic movies. There is no particular theme to their sketches, and most of the humour is derived from their conversations, which are often laced with acerbic wit. The topics of their conversations have included Ray questioning Colin's fandom of Liverpool F.C., and Colin's encounter with a Victorian time-traveller.
Leslie: a caricatured super-villain - played by Mitchell dressed in a similar fashion to Dr. Evil, but with flowing blonde hair - who appears in sketches where one is required, such as a number of sketches where he is criticised by a henchman for his use of needlessly ambiguous terms when ordering murders, and where his designs for his fortress (such as a revolving wall and trapdoors) are foiled by health and safety requirements. He also features as an antagonist in the "Agent Suave" sketch, and in the Cash4Plutonium sketch as the secret owner of the service.

Production
The show follows on from the duo's earlier TV series The Mitchell and Webb Situation, and is an extension of their Radio 4 sketch show That Mitchell and Webb Sound. The show's producer Gareth Edwards commented that the show's pitch to the BBC "was the shortest pitch I've ever written", citing that the show "has worked on the radio, just like Little Britain worked on the radio and Dead Ringers worked on the radio, and they transferred successfully to TV, so why don't you [the BBC] transfer this one to TV as well?"

A pilot for the show was filmed on 27 January 2006 at BBC Television Centre, with a full series being later commissioned. Preview nights for the show were held at The Drill Hall in London on 11 January and 20 March 2006, and at Ginglik in Shepherd's Bush in London on 14 and 21 May 2006. These took the form of a radio recording, with verbal prompting to the audience for any visual element that would be required. The series was shot on location in June 2006 and three audience recording sessions were held in Studio 4 at BBC Television Centre on 14, 21 and 28 July 2006.

Following the first series, the pair went on a tour of 44 UK venues between October and December 2006, entitled The Two Faces of Mitchell and Webb, featuring many of the same sketches as That Mitchell and Webb Look.

A preview night for the second series was held on 18 May 2007 at The Drill Hall in London. This series was shot in high-definition on location during June/July 2007 and three studio recordings with an audience were held at TC8 in Television Centre on 3, 10 and 17 August 2007.

Two preview nights for series three were announced on 30 June 2008 on the BBC Tickets website; all tickets were booked in less than 24 hours. The first preview night took place on 13 July 2008 at The Drill Hall, with the second held there on 10 August 2008. Two audience recording sessions at Television Centre – with additional live sketches – were announced on 3 October 2008, and took place on 31 October and 7 November 2008, again in high-definition in studio TC8. A third recording session at the BBC Radio Theatre was announced on 10 October 2008, taking place on 18 November 2008.

A preview night for the fourth series was announced on 18 November 2009 on the BBC Tickets website; this was held on 26 November 2009 at The Drill Hall.

Podcast
In a 2020 episode of the podcast Rule of Three, David Mitchell, Jason Hazeley and Jonathan Dryden-Taylor discussed several of the series four sketches. The series had a bleaker tone, contributing factors potentially including the public mood in the aftermath of the 2007–08 financial crash, inspiration from the writers' upbringings during fears of nuclear warfare, and an increase in the prominence of dramas at the time.

A series of sketches labelled "After the Event" or "Post-Apocalyptic Gameshow", later to be known as "Remain Indoors", featured in three series three episodes and each of the six series four episodes. The last six episodes were devised in the writers' room and then written by Mitchell, Hazeley, Dryden-Taylor and Joel Morris, who divided into pairs and wrote three episodes apiece. Though Mitchell said he was uncomfortable with it in 2020, reference is made in the sketches to all the children having died in the apocalypse, an idea independently conceived by both pairs of writers.

Mitchell's character's suit becomes increasingly damaged throughout the episodes. The character Sheila seems to believe that society will return to normal if people continue practising pre-Event routines in a ritualistic fashion, such as producing game shows. Mitchell linked this to another sketch conceived by the writers in which inhabitants of Pompeii begin to frantically recycle after the nearby volcano erupts.

Another sketch about a spaceship employee who returns from a sick day to find all of his colleagues involved in a religion referencing a deity called "Vectron" was taken from an occurrence during the writing process. During a break, several of the writers were playing with a ball and one began shouting "By Vectron!" in the style of the Galaxy Quest catchphrase "By Grabthar's Hammer!" Another writer returned from the bathroom to find the writers making many references to the unknown entity Vectron.

Reception
The show was nominated for two British Comedy Awards in 2006, in the categories of "Britain's Best New TV Comedy" and the "Highland Spring People's Choice"; it won neither of the awards. Nevertheless, the show did go on to receive a BAFTA in 2007, in the category "Best Comedy Programme or Series"; it was later nominated for another BAFTA in 2009, in the same category. The show was also named "Best British TV Sketch Show 2006" at The Comedy.co.uk Awards.

A scene on the show during which Mitchell and Webb pretended to be SS officers and one asked "Hans, are we the baddies?" later became a popular Internet meme in the early 2020s.

DVD release
All four series of the show have been released on DVD, all released through different distributors under license from the BBC.

The first series was released on DVD in the UK by Contender Home Entertainment on 29 October 2007. Extras include Outtakes, Behind the Scenes footage and a Mitchell & Webb documentary.

The second series was released on DVD in the UK by FremantleMedia on 20 October 2008.

The third series was released on DVD in the UK by 2Entertain on 20 July 2009.

The fourth series was released in the UK by FremantleMedia on 4 October 2010.

Worldwide broadcast

References

External links

Cast

2006 British television series debuts
2010 British television series endings
2000s British satirical television series
2000s British television sketch shows
2010s British satirical television series
2010s British television sketch shows
BAFTA winners (television series)
BBC satirical television shows
BBC television sketch shows
British parody television series
English-language television shows
Television series based on radio series